Empress Sunmok (순목황후, 順穆皇后; literally "the accomplishment and majestic empress") of the Tae clan (태씨, 泰氏) (died 830; r. 817–818), was a queen consort of Balhae as the wife of King Gan (Dae Myeongchung).

Her existence is first known by the excavating of her tomb and tombstone in Ancient Tombs at Longtou Mountain, China. From the year she reigned as a queen of Balhae from 817 until 818, she outlived twelve years more until her death in 12th year of Geonheung era (830) and buried in Loungtou Mountain not long after that.

In 2004–5, at least 14 tombs during the Balhae period were unearthed from the Longtou Mountain. Chinese governments then revealed that one of the tombs that named M3 which the form is a large stone tomb, was Sunmok's tomb. Her gravestone is a reddish-brown sandstone with 34.5 cm wide, 55 cm high, 13 cm thick. Not much information appears other than that.

References

Balhae people
Korean royal consorts
Year of birth unknown
830 deaths
9th-century Korean women